Frédéric Amorison (born 16 February 1978) is a retired Belgian professional road bicycle racer who last rode for UCI Continental team .

Amorison left  at the end of the 2013 season, and joined  for the 2014 season.

Major Results

2002
 1st Sparkassen Giro Bochum
 1st Stage 2 Tour de la Région Wallonne
 4th Grand Prix d'Isbergues
 6th Grote Prijs Stad Zottegem
 9th Grand Prix de Fourmies
2005
 3rd Delta Profronde van Midden-Zeeland
 7th Schaal Sels-Merksem
2006
 3rd Rund um die Hainleite
 4th Grote Prijs Jef Scherens
 4th Kampioenschap van Vlaanderen
 4th Omloop van het Houtland
 6th Le Samyn
 7th Paris–Brussels
 9th Grand Prix de Fourmies
 10th Overall Driedaagse van West-Vlaanderen
 10th Overall Tour of Belgium
2007
 3rd Grote Prijs Jef Scherens
 4th Dutch Food Valley Classic
 5th Kampioenschap van Vlaanderen
 6th Grote Prijs Stad Zottegem
 8th Kuurne–Brussels–Kuurne
 8th Tour de Rijke
2008
 4th Overall Driedaagse van West-Vlaanderen
 8th Memorial Rik Van Steenbergen
 9th Overall Étoile de Bessèges
 9th Nokere Koerse
 10th Kuurne–Brussels–Kuurne
2009
 3rd Grote Prijs Jef Scherens
 6th Omloop Het Nieuwsblad
 6th Paris–Brussels
2010
 1st Dwars door het Hageland
 3rd Antwerpse Havenpijl
 4th Overall Three Days of De Panne
 7th Ronde van Drenthe
2011
 1st De Vlaamse Pijl
 3rd Kattekoers
 7th Classic Loire Atlantique
 8th Trofeo Laigueglia
 10th Nokere Koerse
2012
 1st De Vlaamse Pijl
 1st Grote Prijs Jean-Pierre Monseré
 3rd Grote Prijs Jef Scherens
 9th Overall Tour of Hainan
2013
 1st  Mountains classification Tour de l'Eurometropole
 2nd Overall Tour of Hainan
 4th Heistse Pijl
 7th Ruddervoorde Koerse
 8th Gullegem Koerse
 9th Kustpijl
 10th Grote Prijs Wase Polders
2014
 10th La Roue Tourangelle

References

External links

Frédéric Amorison profile at Landbouwkrediet

1978 births
Living people
Belgian male cyclists
Cyclists from Hainaut (province)
People from Belœil